Events in the year 1990 in Pakistan.

Incumbents

Federal government 
President: Ghulam Ishaq Khan 
Prime Minister: 
 until 6 August: Benazir Bhutto 
 6 August-6 November: Ghulam Mustafa Jatoi 
 starting 6 November: Nawaz Sharif
Chief Justice: Muhammad Afzal Zullah (starting 1 January)

Governors 
Governor of Balochistan – Musa Khan 
Governor of Khyber Pakhtunkhwa – Amir Gulistan Janjua 
Governor of Punjab – Tikka Khan (until 6 August); Mian Muhammad Azhar (starting 6 August)
Governor of Sindh – Fakhruddin G. Ebrahim (until 6 August); Mahmoud Haroon (starting 6 August)

Events 
 January: Sukkur rail disaster.
 August: Benazir Bhutto is dismissed as Prime Minister of Pakistan on charges of incompetence and corruption.

Deaths
Najeeb Ahmed, leftist student activist, on 6 April

See also
1989 in Pakistan
1991 in Pakistan
Timeline of Pakistani history
List of Pakistani films of 1990

References

External links
 Timeline: Pakistan - BBC

 
1990 in Asia